The General Honour Decoration was a civil and military decoration of the Grand Duchy of Hesse.  Established 25 September 1843, the medal could be awarded to recognize several different accomplishments or merits.  The reason for the award of the medal was determined by the inscription on the reverse of the medal, with the obverse bearing the effigy of the reigning Grand Duke of Hesse.

Recipients of the Hessian Bravery Medal (Hessische Tapferkeitsmedaille)
Philipp, Landgrave of Hesse
 Hauptmann Curt von Brandenstein, 1879-1964, Pour le Me'rite 26.9.1918 Leibregiment Grossherzogin (3. Grossherzoglich Hessisches) Nr.117

References

Notes

Orders, decorations, and medals of Hesse
1843 establishments in the Grand Duchy of Hesse
Awards established in 1843